Abracadabra is the twenty-second studio album by the Japanese rock band Buck-Tick, released on September 21, 2020 by the label Lingua Sounda, subdivision of Victor Entertainment and November 20, 2020 internationally by JPU Records. It was released in two editions in Japan: regular and limited in three formats: CD + Blu-ray, cassette and vinyl. Internationally it was released on CD and cassette with bonus tracks.

Background 
The name "Abracadabra", taken from the lyrics of the song "Eureka", was chosen by lead guitarist and songwriter Hisashi Imai. In an interview with BARKS, Imai says they started composing the album in the middle of spring 2019. Due to the COVID-19 pandemic, the recordings were suspended for a month.

Abracadabra was directed by Junichi Tanaka and the covers were produced by Kazunori Akita.

The album features three new recordings of previously released songs. "Kemonotachi no Yoru" had previously been released as a double A-side single alongside the non-album song "Rondo" a year prior, and "Datenshi" had been released as a single earlier the same year. Both songs appear in new remixed arrangements performed by frequent Buck-Tick collaborator YOW-ROW of the band Gari. "Kogoeru" had been released one month earlier as the B-side to the "Moonlight Escape" single and appears on the album in a new remixed form courtesy of their longtime collaborator Cube Juice.

Following the album's release in Japan it was announced that the band had partnered with London-based label JPU Records to release an international special edition of Abracadabra, marking the first time in the band's history that one of their albums was officially distributed outside of Asia. The international edition comes with a new cover design and 4 bonus tracks. Initially announced with a November 2020 release date, it was eventually pushed to February 2021 due to production delays caused by the COVID-19 pandemic.

Tour 
Due to the pandemic, the album promotion shows with audience became impracticable. Buck-Tick performed the online concert "ABRACADABRA LIVE ON THE NET" on September 21.

Chart performance 
Abracadabra peaked at the third position on the Oricon Albums Chart and sold about 15,902 copies in its first week. It peaked at 5th place on Billboard Japan.

Track listing

Personnel

Buck-Tick 
 Atsushi Sakurai - singing
 Hisashi Imai - lead guitar, backing vocals
 Hidehiko Hoshino - rhythm guitar
 Yutaka Higuchi - bass
 Toll Yagami - drums

Production 
 Junichi Tanaka - direction
 Kazunori Akita - album covers

References

External links
 
 

Buck-Tick albums
Japanese-language albums
2020 albums